The Secretary for Finance and Budget is the Minister of Finance of San Marino.

Together with the Secretary for Interior and the Secretary for Foreign Affairs, this officer is one of the three members of the executive Congress of State directly appointed by the Grand and General Council, the parliament of the republic. The position was established in 1969.

Secretaries
Giancarlo Ghironzi, 1969-1972
Luigi Lonfernini, 1972-1973
Remy Giacomini, 1973-1978
Emilio Della Balda, 1978-1986
Clara Boscaglia, 1986-1990
, 1990-2002
, 2002
Fiorenzo Stolfi, 2002
, 2002-2006
, 2006-2008
Gabriele Gatti, 2008-2010
Pasquale Valentini, 2010-2012
, 2012-2014
Gian Carlo Capicchioni, 2014-2016
, 2016-2018
, 2018-2020
, 2020-

See also
Congress of State
Grand and General Council
Central Bank of San Marino
San Marino Secretary for Foreign Affairs

References

External links
 Official Website

Government of San Marino

1969 establishments in San Marino